The Egyptian Television Network is a television service run by the Egyptian Radio and Television Union. It commenced programming in 1960. Today it has more than three national channels, and several broadcast channels on satellite.

History 

Though the decision to start television service was taken  earlier by the late King Farouk, the British-French-Israeli Suez invasion delayed work until late 1959. Egypt then signed a contract with Radio Corporation of America to provide the country with a television network and the capacity to manufacture sets. Construction of the radio and television center was completed in 1960, and the first Egyptian television broadcast started on July 21, 1960.

Broadcast transmission began on July 21, 1960, at 07:00, the Egyptian TV was started with a five-hour-transmission. The transmission began with Qur'anic recitation followed by the opening of the parliament and a speech by President Gamal Abdel Nasser. This was followed by the national anthem, then the news bulletin and finally ended with Qur'anic recitation.

Broadcast began from Maspero television building whose transmission began in 1960. Ever since, the Egyptian television maintained its service of broadcasting through the different channels which serve different classes of the Egyptian society.

The big building that takes its name after the French Egyptologist, Gaston Maspero, is deemed a distinguished site with its circular shape that receives over 30 thousand individuals daily. Egypt is the first country in the Middle East and Africa to provide TV broadcasting.

On August 13, 1970 a new decree established the Egyptian Radio and Television Union (ERTU) and created four distinct sectors: Radio, Television, Engineering and Finance, each of which had a chairman who reported directly to the Minister of Information.

After the 1973 war, both television production and transmission facilities were upgraded to color transmission under the SECAM system. The Egyptian broadcasting changed from SECAM to PAL in 1992.

Transmission Hours
The Egyptian television began with a six-hour-broadcasting channel; however the broadcasting hours changed to 13 hours/day. Later, in 1961, a second channel was launched, and a third channel was launched in 1962. Thus, the total broadcasting hours of the three channels was 25–30 hours/day. The contents of the shows reflected people's interests at the time.

In the early 1980s, the Egyptian TV witnessed development in all domains and the orientation was to activate the media sovereignty principle through engineering and geographic expansion for a state-wide-coverage.

Private channels 
The first private Egyptian channel "Dream TV" was established on November 2, 2001. The channel is owned by the Egyptian businessman Ahmed Bahgat. In 2002, another channel "el-Mehwer TV" was established which is now owned by Dr. Hassan Rateb and the Egyptian radio and television union.

Criticism 
Since its establishment, Egyptian television has always been regarded as the voice of Egyptian government and the ruling political party. Both the ERTU and the Television sector chairmen are appointed by the Minister of Information. Terrestrial channels,  Egyptian satellite channel  and specialized Nile channels are under direct government supervision, operation and ownership.

Private channels have a considerable freedom but with some limits.  According to a study by the Cairo Institute for Human Rights (CIRS), during presidential elections both state-owned television channels and independent channels devoted more time to  cover Mubarak's campaign than for the other nine candidates.

Another example for government intervention in private channels was banning the Egyptian famous journalist Mohamed Hassanein Heikal from appearing in Dream TV. Dream aired a lecture Heikal gave at the American University in Cairo in which he commented on speculation surrounding the bequeathing of the presidency in Egypt. This was the last time he appeared on Egyptian TV.

According to Reporters without borders 2005 report ; Egyptian media ranks 143rd  out of 167 countries in freedom of the press.

See also 

 List of television networks by country
 The Return of the Spirit
 The Family of Mr Shalash

References 

 Egyptian Radio and Television from Egypt state information service.
 Egypt from the museum of broadcast communication.

External links

Television stations in Egypt
1960 establishments in Egypt
Mass media companies established in 1960
Television channels and stations established in 1960
Mass media in Cairo